The 2012–13 Algerian Ligue Professionnelle 2 was the forty-ninth edition of the Algerian second division since its establishment, and its third season of the league under its current title. A total of 16 teams contested the league. The league started September 14, 2012, and concluded on May 3, 2013. CRB Aïn Fakroun were crowned champions and promoted to the 2013–14 Algerian Ligue Professionnelle 1 along with RC Arbaâ and MO Béjaïa. At the bottom of the table, MO Constantine, SA Mohammadia and CR Témouchent were relegated.

Changes from last season

Team changes

From Ligue Professionnelle 2
Promoted to Ligue 1
 CA Bordj Bou Arréridj
 USM Bel-Abbès
 JS Saoura

Relegated to Ligue Nationale
 US Biskra
 RC Kouba
 Paradou AC

To Ligue Professionnelle 2
Relegated from Ligue 1
 AS Khroub
 MC Saïda
 NA Hussein Dey

Promoted from Ligue Nationale
 CRB Aïn Fakroun
 CR Témouchent
 RC Arbaâ

Team overview

Stadia and locations

Competition

League table

Leader week after week

The bottom of the table week after week

Season statistics

Top scorers

See also
 2012–13 Algerian Ligue Professionnelle 1
 2012–13 Algerian Cup

References

Algerian Ligue 2 seasons
2012–13 in Algerian football leagues
Algeria